Michael-Fredrick Paul Sauka (1934 – 15 August 1990) was a Malawian composer. He composed and wrote the words for "Mlungu dalitsani Malawi", the national anthem of Malawi. He died in poverty in 1990.

References

 Reference, National Anthems of the World

1934 births
1990 deaths
Malawian composers
National anthem writers
Male composers
20th-century composers
20th-century male musicians